The 1970 Indiana State Sycamores football team represented Indiana State University as an independent during the 1970 NCAA College Division football season. Led by fourth-year head coach Jerry Huntsman, the Sycamores compiled a record of 5–5.

Schedule

References

Indiana State
Indiana State Sycamores football seasons
Indiana State Sycamores football